"Anthem of the People's Republic of Kampuchea" was the national anthem of the People's Republic of Kampuchea from 1979 to 1992. It was composed by Keo Chinda and Chy Saopea. While Vietnam and most Communist governments recognized the People's Republic of Kampuchea during its existence, the Khmer Rouge, together with the monarchists and Khmer People's National Liberation Front, formed the Coalition Government of Democratic Kampuchea that continued to use the anthem of Democratic Kampuchea. It was this government-in-exile that was recognized by China, North Korea, Romania, and most Western Bloc governments and the United Nations; as such, many Western sources continued to list "Dap Prampi Mesa Chokchey" as being the Cambodian national anthem until the restoration of the monarchy in 1993.

Lyrics

References

war
1976 songs
1979 in Cambodia
Cambodian songs
Historical national anthems
National symbols of Cambodia